Piranesi is an Italian surname. Notable people with the surname include:

Giovanni Battista Piranesi (1720–1778), Italian artist
Francesco Piranesi (1758/59–1810), Italian engraver and architect, son of Giovanni Battista Piranesi
Laura Piranesi (1754–1789), Italian etcher, daughter of Giovanni Battista Piranesi

See also
Piranesi (software), architectural visualisation software by Informatix Software
Piranesi (novel), a 2020 novel by Susanna Clarke
 Piranesi (journal), academic journal from Slovenia

Italian-language surnames